Although prostitution in Morocco has been illegal since the 1970s it is widespread. In 2015 the Moroccan Health Ministry estimated there were 50,000 prostitutes in Morocco, the majority in the Marrakech area. Prostitutes tend to be Moroccan women from lower socioeconomic backgrounds as well as migrants from sub Saharan Africa, many of whom are victims of human trafficking  UNAIDS estimated the figure at 75,000 in 2016.
 
Many children are vulnerable as adoption laws in Morocco are very rigid and difficult. Morocco's increasing reputation for attracting foreign pedophiles made it sign various international treaties to deal with the problem. Male prostitution exists but is stigmatised.
Health services for Moroccan sex workers include OPALS, an organisation promoting treatments for HIV/AIDS.
 
Traditionally, women's roles in North African society have been rigidly defined, particularly so with increasing Islamification. Yet the economic and social realities often provide few alternatives to many Moroccan women, and the area has increasingly been seen as permissive to prostitution.

French colonial rule
 
 
During French colonial rule prostitution was regulated. The authorities were concerned about the spread of STIs, particularly syphilis, amongst the troops stationed in the colony. "Quartiers  
réservés" (red-light districts) were set up in several cities, where prostitution was permitted, notably in Bousbir in Casablanca.  
 
Within these quartiers réservés, prostitutes had to be registered and have mandatory regular health checks. They had to carry their registration card with them at all times and travel outside the quarter was only allowed by permit. 
 
Outside these quarters, maisons de tolérance (brothels) were set up for the use of Europeans. The prostitutes in these maisons were subject to the same regulation. 
 
Some prostitutes worked outside the quartiers réservés. There was frequent police action against these clandestines and they were forced to take a medical test. Those, who were healthy received a warning. If they had a sexually transmitted infection, they were taken to a hospital. On release from the hospital, they were taken to the quartiers réservés. Women who received three warnings were forcibly taken to the quartiers réservés. 
 
Where troops were stationed away from the cities, bordels militaires de campagne (mobile brothels) were set up for the soldiers.

Much Loved
Much Loved is a 2015 French–Moroccan film about the prostitution scene in Marrakesh. The film tells about the lives of four prostitutes and shows their exploitation by pimps and the corruption of the police.  
 
The film was banned in Morocco for its "contempt for moral values and the Moroccan woman". The leading actress, Loubna Abidar, received death threats and in November 2015, she was violently attacked in Casablanca and left the country for France soon after. Religious authorities condemned the film for portraying a negative image of Morocco, with its supporting of extramarital sex and sympathy for homosexuals.

Chikhat
Chikhat (Arabic شيخة shīkha) is a Moroccan term for singers, musicians, dancers and prostitutes
 
Traditionally female entertainers were also prostitutes. Often they were part of a traveling show. In modern times performers of the Chikhat dance are generally not prostitutes, but wedding dancers.

Sex trafficking

Morocco is a source, destination, and transit country for women and children subjected to sex trafficking. According to a November 2015 study conducted by the Moroccan government, with support by an international organization, children are exploited in sex trafficking. The 2015 study also found that some Moroccan women are forced into prostitution in Morocco by members of their families or other intermediaries.

Some female undocumented migrants, primarily from Sub-Saharan Africa and a small but growing number from South Asia, are coerced into prostitution. Criminal networks operating in Oujda on the Algerian border and in the northern coastal town of Nador force undocumented migrant women into prostitution. Some female migrants, particularly Nigerians, who transit Oujda are forced into prostitution once they reach Europe. International organizations, local NGOs, and migrants report unaccompanied children and women from Cote d’Ivoire, Democratic Republic of the Congo, Nigeria, and Cameroon are highly vulnerable to sex trafficking in Morocco. Some reports suggest Cameroonian and Nigerian networks force women into prostitution by threatening the victims and their families; the victims are typically the same nationality as the traffickers.

Moroccan women and children are exploited in sex trafficking, primarily in Europe and the Middle East. Moroccan women forced into prostitution abroad experience restrictions on movement, threats, and emotional and physical abuse.

The United States Department of State Office to Monitor and Combat Trafficking in Persons ranks Morocco as a 'Tier 2' country.

See also
Bordel militaire de campagne
Health in Morocco

References

Further reading